Parabola GNU/Linux-libre is an operating system for the i686, x86-64 and ARMv7 architectures. It is based on many of the packages from Arch Linux and Arch Linux ARM, but distinguishes from the former by offering only free software. It includes the GNU operating system components common to many  Linux distributions and the Linux-libre kernel instead of the generic Linux kernel. Parabola is listed by the Free Software Foundation as a completely free operating system, true to their Free System Distribution Guidelines.

Parabola uses a rolling release model like Arch, such that a regular system update is all that is needed to obtain the latest software. Development focuses on system simplicity, community involvement and use of the latest free software packages.

History 

Parabola was originally proposed by members of the gNewSense IRC channel in 2009. Members of different Arch Linux communities, especially Spanish-speaking members, started the development and maintenance of the project software and documentation.

On May 20, 2011, the Parabola distribution was recognized as a completely free project by GNU, making it part of the FSF list of free distributions.

In February 2012 Dmitrij D. Czarkoff reviewed Parabola for OSNews. Czarkoff reported that on his test computer a number of hardware problems surfaced, due to lack of free firmware. He said 

Czarkoff also criticized the lack of documentation available for Parabola. He concluded "The overall impression of the Parabola GNU/Linux user experience exactly matches the one of Arch: a system with easy and flexible installation and configuration process and good choice of free software packages. Though the lack of documentation spoils the user experience, the Arch Linux resources can be used to further configure and extend the distribution. If my hardware would allow, I would probably stick with Parabola."

Parabola used to have a mips64el port to provide support for the Chinese Loongson processor used in the Lemote Yeeloong laptop. It was discontinued due to a lack of resources and interest, and the final activity was seen in July 2014.

Robert Rijkhoff reviewed Parabola GNU/Linux for DistroWatch in September 2017.

Differences from Arch and Arch ARM 

The project uses only 100% free software from the official Arch repositories for the i686 and x86-64 architectures and official Arch ARM repositories (except [alarm] and [aur]) for the ARMv7. It uses free replacements when possible, such as the Linux-libre kernel instead of the generic Linux kernel.

The filtering process removes around 700 software packages from the repositories that do not meet the requirements of the Free Software Definition for each architecture.

Social contract

Parabola has established a social contract. The Parabola Social Contract commits the project to the free software community (viewing itself as only competing against nonfree systems), free culture, democracy, and to follow Arch's philosophy. Under the covenant are included the GNU Free System Distribution Guidelines.

Installation

There are two ways to install Parabola, either from scratch using installable ISO images, or by migrating from an existing Arch-based system. The latter process is almost as simple as switching to the Parabola repositories list.

TalkingParabola

TalkingParabola is a derivative install CD based on TalkingArch. It is a respin of the Parabola ISO modified to include speech and braille output for blind and visually impaired users. TalkingParabola retains all the features of the Parabola live image, but adds speech and braille packages to make it possible for blind and visually impaired users to install Parabola eyes-free.

Mascots 

The Parabola community has created a number of cartoon characters for the project. The characters are a gnu and a cat named "Bola", who is conceived after Parabola's main characteristics: "elegant, minimalist and lightweight".

See also

GNU/Linux naming controversy
GNU variants
List of Arch-based Linux distributions

References

External links 

 
 
 Parabola GNU/Linux-libre appears on news section on SOLAR website (Software Libre Argentina)

2009 software
Arch-based Linux distributions
Free software only Linux distributions
Pacman-based Linux distributions
Rolling Release Linux distributions
Linux distributions